Heliotrope is a pink-purple tint that is a representation of the colour of the heliotrope flower.

The first recorded use of heliotrope as a color name in English was in 1882.

Variations

Heliotrope gray

The color heliotrope gray is displayed at right. The first recorded use of heliotrope gray as a colour name in English was in 1912.

Heliotrope magenta

Old heliotrope

At right is displayed the colour old heliotrope.

Another name for this colour is old helio.

The first recorded use of old helio as a colour name in English was in 1926.

In culture
The color has been widely referenced as a characterization, the colour of key plot objects, or as flavor text in many works:
 Heliotrope was a popular colour reference of Ray Galton and Alan Simpson, script writers of Hancock's Half Hour.
 In James Joyce's Finnegans Wake, "heliotrope" is the answer to the Maggies' riddle. Throughout the chapter, the word "heliotrope" is disguised a number of times, hidden either in anagrams, riddles, puns, or obscure allusions.
 In Harry Potter and the Deathly Hallows, the Polyjuice Potion brewed in order to disguise Hermione Granger as Mafalda Hopkirk is described as having a "pleasant heliotrope colour."
 The periorbital purplish discoloration occurring in dermatomyositis is called the "Heliotrope rash" after the colour.
 Heliotrope was among the handful of "half-mourning" colours worn by Victorians during the last stage of mourning.
 "Heliotrope" is the title of the fourth track on At the Drive-In's 1999 EP Vaya.
 Heliotrope was referenced as a health status condition of the service droid Kryten in the Red Dwarf Series V episode Terrorform.
"Heliotrope Bouquet" is a slow drag two step by Scott Joplin (with contributions from Louis Chauvin) composed in 1907.

See also 
 Heliotrope (disambiguation)
 Lists of colours

References 

Shades of pink
Shades of violet